State Highway 72 (abbreviated SH-72 or OK-72) is a state highway in the U.S. state of Oklahoma. It runs from north to south through the east-central part of the state, with a length of almost 33 miles (53 km). It does not have any lettered spur routes.

Route description
SH-72 begins at U.S. Highway 266 west of Checotah and heads north, passing through Council Hill after 4 miles (6.4 km). Two miles south of Boynton, it meets US-62, with which it starts a duplex. Past Boynton, the concurrent routes have a junction with US-64 and SH-16; here, US-62 splits off of SH-72 and US-64 joins it.

Near Haskell, US-64 splits off SH-72, headed towards Tulsa. SH-72 continues northward to cross the Arkansas River, to Coweta.

History 

The clearance below the railroad underpass in downtown Coweta near the junction with SH-51 was previously only .

Junction list

References

External links
SH-72 at Roadklahoma

072
Transportation in McIntosh County, Oklahoma
Transportation in Muskogee County, Oklahoma
Transportation in Wagoner County, Oklahoma